KBXN (1380 AM) was a radio station licensed to serve Ontario, Oregon.  The station was licensed to FM Idaho Co., LLC.  The station went dark in June 2019.

History
The station was assigned the KSRV call letters by the Federal Communications Commission in 1946. KSRV changed the call letters to KKOO on September 14, 2016. KKOO changed the call letters to KBXN on March 12, 2019, and began stunting.  The KKOO calls and oldies format moved to 1260 AM Weiser.

KBXN's license was cancelled June 19, 2019.

Previous logo

References

External links
FCC Station Search Details: DKBXN (Facility ID: 35637)
FCC History Cards for KBXN (covering 1945-1980 as KSRV)

BXN
Ontario, Oregon
Radio stations established in 1946
1946 establishments in Oregon
Defunct radio stations in the United States
Radio stations disestablished in 2019
2019 disestablishments in Oregon
BXN